The Five of Hearts is an Australian film.

It is also known as A Maiden's Distress or Buffalo Bill. It was reportedly the longest of Cole's films.

It is considered a lost film.

Plot
In the old American west, Rose, the daughter of Colonel Daniels, is kidnapped by a desperado named Black Bill at the instigation of Captain Clarke, a rejected lover. She is taken to an Indian camp where she is subjected to torture by being tied to a tree, and daggers thrown all round her until she is completely surrounded by them. She is rescued by Buffalo Bill, her lover. Black Bill and Captain Clarke are killed.

According to contemporary reports, the scenes of the film were:
Captain Clarke's Treachery; 
Chloroformed; 
On the Trail; 
Jim Blake's Shanty; 
In the Indian Camp; 
Rose Tortured;
Surrounded by Daggers; 
Rescued;
Buffalo Bill at the Stake;
The Indian Chiefs Fight with Knives; 
Black Bill's Lair; 
The Traitors Punished.
Another report said that "'the scene is laid on the outskirts of the Indian Reservation, a country made famous by the exploits of the renowned Buffalo Bill, and the story of the play treats of the adventures of the colonel in charge of the military post and a notorious cattle stealer whom he eventually makes captive."

Cast
E.I. Cole as Buffalo Bill
Frank Mills
Bella Cole
Vene Linden as Rose Daniels

Original Play
The film is an adaptation of an open-air stage show regularly produced by Cole and his Bohemian Dramatic Company, Buffalo Bill, or the Five of Hearts, about an Indian woman who refuses to marry a cowboy. The Indian has daggers thrown at her in a test of courage. The cowboy tries to kill the woman but Chief Wild Friday intervenes and frees her.

According to one report "Buffalo Bill is 'a part which Mr Cole has created, and made "his own", his personality entirely fitting him for it. He is helped by a striking resemblance to Colonel Cody."

Production
The film was shot near Melbourne.

Release
The film sometimes screened on a double bill with another movie of Cole's, Sentenced for Life, and was accompanied by songs and lectures.

According to one review, "the play Is well staged, and the acting Is of a high order, and, on the whole, the film augurs well for the success of the industry in the Commonwealth." Another said the film "forms a thrilling subject."

Only four and a half minutes of the film survive today.

References

External links
 
 The Five of Hearts at National Film and Sound Archive
The Five of Hearts at AustLit

Australian black-and-white films
Australian silent short films
Lost Australian films
1911 films